David Edwin Woodley is an Australian theatre, television and film actor, director and writer.

Career
He began his career as a stage actor in Brisbane, Australia performing under the direction of renown Shakespearean director Bryan Nason AM. Woodley toured with local theatre company Grin and Tonic. before again performing under the direction of Bryan Nason in dual roles as Ea and Utnapishtim, in The Royal Queensland Theatre Company's production of Gilgamesh. Believing the UK produced most exceptional actors, Woodley moved to England to undertake drama studies at St Catherine's Drama Studio in Guildford, Surrey, UK under the direction of June and Adrian Cooper. Whilst living in the UK, he also undertook private voice studies with Alan Woodhouse at Guildhall School of Music and Drama, London.

Being an avid and competent horseman, on Woodley's return to Australia he trained in stunts with Canadian born stunt co-coordinator Ric Anderson  in 'Horses and Heroes' a live western stunt show on the Gold Coast. He relocated to Sydney in 1995 after gaining the role of series regular, Hopper Hadley in the Network 10 television drama Echo Point, along with fellow actors, Rose Byrne (28 Weeks Later) and Martin Henderson (The Ring). Woodley went on to become a series regular with the long running series, Home and Away as Joel Nash from 1998–2000.

Woodley has performed roles in many Australian drama series including the award-winning ABC TV series Rake as well as US productions of Spartacus - Gods of the Arena and 
Legend of the Seeker

Woodley plays Mike Evans in the first installment of the Science Fiction Trilogy The Three-Body Problem  adapted from the novel of the same name written by acclaimed Chinese author and winner of the 2015 Hugo Awards, Liu Cixin. The film is due to be released in July 2017.

Woodley holds a Degree in Film Production from SAE Institute Sydney.

References

Australian male soap opera actors
Male actors from Queensland
Living people
Year of birth missing (living people)